The 2019 GP de Plouay featured as the twentieth round of the 2019 UCI Women's World Tour and was held on 31 August 2019, in Plouay, France. The race was held one day before the men's Bretagne Classic.

Teams
128 riders from 22 teams started the race. Each team has a maximum of six riders:

Results

References

External links
 Official site

GP de Plouay
GP de Plouay
GP de Plouay